The Elves of Alfheim is an accessory for the Dungeons & Dragons fantasy role-playing game that describes the elven forest nation of Alfheim in the Mystara setting.

Contents
The Elves of Alfheim is a sourcebook which details the elf nation of Alfheim.

Publication history
The Elves of Alfheim was written by Steve Perrin and Anders Swenson, with a cover by Clyde Caldwell and interior illustrations by Stephen Fabian, and was published by TSR in 1988 as a 96-page booklet with a large color map and an outer folder.

Reception

Reviews

References

1988 books
Dungeons & Dragons Gazetteers
Mystara
Role-playing game supplements introduced in 1988